

List of rulers of Kingdom of Mutapa
Territory located in present-day Zimbabwe.

Mwenemutapa = Lord of the Conquered Land.

Sources

History of Zimbabwe